Patrick Kinney McCaughan (8 September 1844 – 25 December 1903) was a 19th-century Member of Parliament from Southland, New Zealand.

He represented the Riverton electorate from 1879 to 1881, when he retired.

References

1844 births
1903 deaths
Members of the New Zealand House of Representatives
New Zealand MPs for South Island electorates
19th-century New Zealand politicians